The Invisible Boy is a 2014 Italian fantasy-superhero film directed by Gabriele Salvatores.

Plot 
Michele Silenzi is a shy thirteen-year-old kid from Trieste who lives with his single mom (a local police inspector). He is often overlooked at school and is picked on regularly by the school bullies. He wants to attend a fancy dress party as the object of his desires, classmate Stella, is going. Unfortunately, the fifty Euro note he was to use to buy a superhero costume was stolen by the bullies. He instead has to settle for a much cheaper costume that he is told belongs to an obscure Chinese superhero who has mystical powers.

The bullies embarrass him at the party by showing Stella that he has been secretly filming her on his phone. Mortified, Michele makes his escape into the night but not before wishing the costume would make him invisible. He later discovers his wish has come true. At first he uses his power to get his own back on the bullies and to spy on his female classmates in their underwear in the changing room.

It becomes apparent that children at the school are going missing and eventually Stella is kidnapped also. Eventually a mysterious blind man tells Michele that he is his father and that both he and Michele are members of a secret Russian group called The Specials. All members of this group have superpowers and that the reason that the children are going missing is an attempt by The Specials to track Michele down.

By now Michele can control his invisibility and after escaping the leader of the Specials he helps free the children before his father mentally wipes everyone's memory.

The film ends with the revelation that the leader of the Specials is actually Michele's birth mother. The final scene shows her being informed that although they have failed to recruit Michele, but they have located his long-lost twin sister in Morocco.

Cast
Ludovico Girardello as Michele Silenzi
Valeria Golino as Giovanna Silenzi
Fabrizio Bentivoglio as Basili
Noa Zatta as Stella
Hristo Zhivkov as Andreij
Kseniya Rappoport as Yelena
Assil Kandil as Candela
Vernon Dobtcheff as Artiglio
Filippo Valese: Martino Breccia
Enea Barozzi: Brando Volpi
Riccardo Gasparini: Ivan Casadio
Vilius Tumalavicius: Biondo
Vincenzo Zampa: Luigi Minnella
Maria Sole Mansutti: madre di Stella

Sequel 
A sequel titled The Invisible Boy: Second Generation (Il ragazzo invisibile - Seconda generazione) was released in January 2018.

See also  
 List of Italian films of 2014

References

External links

2014 fantasy films
2010s superhero films
2014 films
Films directed by Gabriele Salvatores
European Film Awards winners (films)
Italian coming-of-age films
Italian fantasy films
Italian superhero films
Teen superhero films
Films about invisibility
Films set in Trieste
2010s Italian films